List of Jain inscriptions

References

Jain inscriptions
Jainism-related lists
History of Jainism